Stocksbridge is a town and civil parish in the City of Sheffield, South Yorkshire, England.  The parish contains 38 listed buildings that are recorded in the National Heritage List for England.  All the listed buildings are designated at Grade II, the lowest of the three grades, which is applied to "buildings of national importance and special interest".  The parish is to the northwest of the city of Sheffield, and in addition to Stocksbridge contains the villages of Bolsterstone and Deepcar.

The listed buildings consist of houses and associated structures, guideposts and milestones, a bridge, stocks, a telephone box, and a war memorial.


Buildings

References

Citations

Sources

 

Lists of listed buildings in South Yorkshire
Buildings and structures in Sheffield
Stocksbridge